The Horrible Imaginings Film Festival (HIFF) is an annual film festival originally based in San Diego until 2018, when it moved to Santa Ana. It was established in 2009 by Miguel Rodriguez.

History 
Director Miguel Rodriguez is the curator for the festival founded in 2009. In 2015, the festival was held at Museum of Photographic Arts in San Diego. In a 2015 interview with MovieMaker, Rodriguez spoke about making "the films the most important part of the festival". In 2018, the festival relocated to The Frida Cinema in Santa Ana, California. MovieMaker listed the festival on their 30 Bloody Best Genre Fests in the World in 2019. The festival received over seven hundred submissions for its tenth anniversary. It was held annually for three consecutive days in September before running seven days virtually due to the COVID-19 pandemic in 2020. In 2021, the festival returned with a "hybrid model" allowing for in-person and virtual options to audiences.

Notable films 
Brentwood Strangler was nominated Best Actress for Jordan Ladd in 2016. The Phantom Hour by Brian Butler screened the same year.

Red Christmas by Craig Anderson, Blood and Black Lace by Mario Bava, and Happy Hunting by Joe Dietsch and Louie Gibson screened in 2017. That same year, Hush won Best San Diego Film and Midnighters won Best Actress for Alex Essoe, Best Feature for Julius Ramsay and Best Screenplay for Alston Ramsay.

Snowflake won Best Film and Best Director for Adolfo J. Kolmerer in 2018.

Reborn, Antrum, and Porno won awards in 2019.

In 2020, Luz: The Flower of Evil won multiple awards.

We're All Going to the World's Fair by Jane Schoenbrun screened in 2021.

Notable appearances 
Notable attendees include Barbara Magnolfi and Dee Wallace.

References

External links 
 Official website
 

Annual events in California
Cinema of Southern California
Culture of San Diego
Film festivals in San Diego
Film festivals established in 2009
Recurring events established in 2009
Fantasy and horror film festivals in the United States
Culture of Santa Ana, California